The Villa Medici is a patrician villa in Fiesole, Tuscany, Italy, the fourth oldest of the villas built for the Medici family.  It was built between 1451 and 1457. It is part of the UNESCO World Heritage Site inscribed as  Medici Villas and Gardens in Tuscany.

See also

Medici villas
Italian Renaissance garden

References:

In Michael Ondaatje's 1992 novel The English Patient, the titular character identifies the ruined convent in which the characters are staying as the Villa Bruscoli, or the Villa Medici in Fiesole.

References

Buildings and structures completed in 1457
Houses completed in the 15th century
Buildings and structures in Fiesole
Fiesole
Italian Renaissance gardens
Landscape design history
Gardens in Tuscany
1457 establishments in Europe
15th-century establishments in the Republic of Florence